Addo Ndala (born 27 April 1973) is a Congolese hurdler. She competed in the women's 400 metres hurdles at the 1992 Summer Olympics.

References

1973 births
Living people
Athletes (track and field) at the 1992 Summer Olympics
Republic of the Congo female hurdlers
Olympic athletes of the Republic of the Congo
Place of birth missing (living people)